The 1999 Louisville Cardinals football team represented the University of Louisville in the 1999 NCAA Division I-A football season. The team, led by John L. Smith, played their home games in Papa John's Cardinal Stadium and ended the season with a 7–5 record.

Schedule

Roster

Team players in the NFL

References

Louisville
Louisville Cardinals football seasons
Louisville Cardinals football